The 1912 SAFL Grand Final was an Australian rules football competition. West Adelaide beat Port Adelaide by 46 to 32.

References 

SANFL Grand Finals
SAFL Grand Final, 1912